Kausaliya is a  clan (gotra) found among the Ahirs of Haryana.

According to British historian Richard Gabriel Fox, King Kausal Singh of the Kausalia clan established chiefdoms and had also established kingdoms near Jodhpur and Gwalior in the seventeenth century.

See also
 Kosli

References

Ahir